Hinduism Today is a quarterly magazine published by the Himalayan Academy, a nonprofit educational institution, in Kapaʻa, Hawaiʻi, USA.  It is distributed throughout the United States and internationally, currently in 60 nations. Founded by Sivaya Subramuniyaswami in 1979, it is a public service of his monastic order to promote an understanding of the Hindu faith, culture, and traditions.

History and topics
Hinduism Today was launched in 1979 by Sivaya Subramuniyaswami (Gurudeva), published by his non-profit organization Himalayan Academy. Originally The New Saivite World, the magazine was a small black-and-white periodical without a fixed publication schedule. The first issue appeared February 1979, with the goal of giving a voice to Gurudeva's worldwide fellowship in a way that was easy to read, simple to produce, mail and handle. The newsletter was to be a people-oriented paper, not so much devoted to philosophy or teaching since the Himalayan Academy was publishing books on Hindu-related metaphysical topics as early as 1957.

In 1996, Sivaya Subramuniyaswami upgraded the newspaper Hinduism Today to a magazine. Recently, the magazine became available online. The over 275,000 readers of the magazine primarily reside in North America, Europe, India, Singapore, Malaysia, Africa and Mauritius.

The magazine presents through a Hindu perspective a wide range of topics, pressing both to society and the individual. These topics include, but are not limited to, the following: education, culture, cosmology, philosophy, ethics, sociology, film, music, spirituality, food, and travel. In addition to regular writers, contributors include the magazine’s readers as well as the collective wisdom of major thinkers of both the eastern and western traditions, as captured in the magazine's regularly included quotations section. Informative articles also offer profound insights into modern life, with topics such as yoga, vegetarianism, meditation, nonviolence, environmental ethics and family life.

Specific goals of the magazine include:

 To foster Hindu solidarity as a unity in diversity among all sects and lineages;
 To inform and inspire Hindus worldwide and people interested in Hinduism;
 To dispels myths, illusions and misinformation about Hinduism;
 To protect, preserve and promote the sacred Vedas and the Hindu religion;
 To nurture and monitor the ongoing spiritual Hindu renaissance;
 To publish a resource for Hindu leaders and educators who promote Sanatana Dharma.

References

For Further Reading: Hinduism Today by R M Chopra, 2009, Kolkata.

External links

 Hinduism Today, digital version (PDF format)
 Publications of Himalayan Academy -  Hinduism Today

1979 establishments in Hawaii
Quarterly magazines published in the United States
Religious magazines published in the United States
Hindu magazines
Hinduism in Hawaii
Hinduism in the United States
Magazines established in 1979
Magazines published in Hawaii